Euchromia isis is a moth of the subfamily Arctiinae. It was described by Jean Baptiste Boisduval in 1832. It is found on the Duke of York Islands in Papua New Guinea.

References

 

Moths described in 1832
Euchromiina